Trnjaci may refer to the following villages:

 Trnjaci (Bijeljina), in municipality of Bijeljina, Bosna and Herzegovina
 Trnjaci (Brčko), in Brčko District, Bosna and Herzegovina
 Trnjaci, Ub, in municipality of Ub, Serbia

See also
 Trnjani (disambiguation)